Pine Run is a tributary of the North Branch Neshaminy Creek, part of the Delaware River watershed. Pine Run flows entirely in Bucks County, Pennsylvania, rising in Plumstead Township, passing through Buckingham Township and New Britain Township, meeting its confluence with the North Branch in the Borough of Chalfont.

History
Pine Run powered two of the earliest mills in central Bucks County; Dyers Mill at Dyerstown and Butler Mill at Chalfont.

Statistics
The Geographic Name Information System I.D. is 1183891, U.S. Department of the Interior Geological Survey I.D. is 02790.

Course

Geology
Appalachian Highlands Division
Piedmont Province
Gettysburg-Newark Lowland Section
Stockton Formation
Lockatong Formation
Pine Run flows within the Stockton Formation, bedrock laid down during the Triassic, consisting of arkosic sandstone, sandstone, shale, siltstone, and mudstone. Then as it enters Chalfont, it enters the Lockatong Formation, also from the Triassic, consisting of argillite, black shale, limestone, and shale.

Municipalities
Bucks County
Borough of Chalfont
New Britain Township
Buckingham Township
Plumstead Township

Crossings and bridges

See also
List of rivers of Pennsylvania
List of rivers of the United States
List of Delaware River tributaries

References

Rivers of Bucks County, Pennsylvania
Rivers of Pennsylvania
Tributaries of the Neshaminy Creek